Kwasi Konadu is an author, scholar, educator, writer, editor, and historian.

Biography 
Kwasi Konadu is John D. and Catherine T. MacArthur Endowed Chair and Professor at Colgate University, where he teaches courses in African history and on worldwide African histories and cultures. With extensive archival and field research in West Africa, Europe, Brazil, the Caribbean, and North America, his writings focus on African and African diasporic histories, as well as major themes in world history. He is the author of Our Own Way in This Part of the World: Biography of an African Community, Culture, and Nation (Duke University Press, 2019), (with Clifford Campbell) The Ghana Reader: History, Culture, Politics (Duke University Press, 2016), Transatlantic Africa, 1440-1888 (Oxford University Press, 2014), The Akan Diaspora in the Americas (Oxford University Press, 2010), among other books.

A father and husband first and foremost, Konadu is also a healer (Tanɔ ɔbosomfoɔ) who studied with his grandfather in Jamaica and then in Takyiman (central Ghana) as well as a publisher of scholarly books about African world histories and cultures through Diasporic Africa Press. His life work is devoted to knowledge production and the worldwide communities and struggles of peoples of African ancestry.

Books

 2022 - Many Black Women of this Fortress: Graça, Mónica and Adwoa, Three Enslaved Women of Portugal’s African Empire
 2019 - Our Own Way in This Part of the World: Biography of an African Community, Culture, and Nation
 2018 - Akan Pioneers: African Histories, Diasporic Experiences
 2016 - The Ghana Reader: History, Culture, Politics (The World Readers) Feb 3, 2016 by Kwasi Konadu and Clifford C. Campbell. In this book Kwasi and Campbell cover 500 years of Ghana's history. The book provides many perspectives about Ghana; historical, political, and cultural. The book discusses the Asante Kingdom (the Gold Coast), and its relationship to European commerce and the transatlantic slave trade. The reader has selections from farmers, traders, clergy, intellectuals, politicians, musicians, and foreign travelers. His source material comes from historical documents, poems, treaties, articles, and fiction. It conveys Ghana's intersecting histories, its contribution to the African Diaspora, its development as a nation, democracy and its significance in the twenty-first century. Duke University Press
 2015 - Akan Peoples: In Africa and the Diaspora - A Historical Reader. This book is a collection of essays about the Akan people of West Africa. They are an ethnic group that exist in West Africa and the Africa Diaspora. The collection of essays are about their, history, culture, in Africa, and their presence among the African Diaspora. Markus Wiener Publishers
 2014 - Transatlantic Africa: 1440-1888. In this book Kwasi gives an African-centric interpretation of the Atlantic slave trade. The source material he uses comes from oral histories and traditions, and written documents.  He examines African societies and their viewpoint. Oxford University Press
 2013 - The Akan People: A Documentary History Markus Wiener Publishers
 2010 - The Akan Diaspora in the Americas Oxford University Press Kwasi documents and demonstrates contributions of the Akan cultural group from West Africa. He examines their experiences in Guyana, Jamaica, Antigua, Barbados, and in North America.
 2009 - View From The East: Black Cultural Nationalism and Education in New York City, Second Edition. Syracuse University Press. The East was a cultural and educational center for people of African descent. It was founded by African American educators and progressive activists during the Black Power Movement. The organization was based in Brooklyn, but its influence was throughout New York City, the United States, the Caribbean, Africa, and Asia. This edition expands research using additional archival information from the first edition.
 2007 - Indigenous Medicine and Knowledge in African Society A study of indigenous medical knowledge systems in Africa and the African Diaspora. Routledge
 2004 - Truth Crushed to the Earth Will Rise Again! (first edition). The East Organization and the Principles and Practice of Nationalist Development (second edition)

See also
Kwasi Kondu - blog
Kwasi Konadu - Writings citations. 
Kwasi Konadu - Interviews

References

External links
GCA Book Launch - Kwasi Konadu's Akan Diaspora in the Americas
Technology and Agriculture in African history
Kwasi Konadu - The Blacksmith’s Tool is Medicine
Kwasi Konado - Interview

1975 births
Living people
21st-century Jamaican writers
Jamaican male writers
21st-century scholars
African-American historians
Jamaican historians
Peoples of the African-American diaspora
21st-century African-American people
20th-century African-American people